Ludab may refer to:
Ludab District
Ludab Rural District